"Santa and the Satellite" was the fifth single released by Buchanan & Goodman, known for their break-in records.  Dickie Goodman again supplies most of the dialogue, and features disc jockey Paul Sherman in place of Bill Buchanan.

This single was more of a seasonal take on the "Flying Saucer" records.  The United States government tries to save Santa Claus from the spacemen on the satellite.  Goodman's character, John Cameron-Cameron, helps Santa escape by disguising himself as Elvis Presley.

The record was moderately successful, peaking at #32 on the Billboard chart in 1957.

Songs 
The songs sampled were:

Part One:
 "Jingle Bells"
 "Black Slacks" by Joe Bennett & the Sparkletones
 "Keep A-Knockin'" by Little Richard
 "Little Bitty Pretty One" by Thurston Harris
 "All I Want for Christmas Is My Two Front Teeth" by Spike Jones & His City Slickers
 "Jailhouse Rock" by Elvis Presley
 "Whole Lotta Shakin' Goin On" by Jerry Lee Lewis

Part Two:
 "Back to School Again" by Timmie Rogers
 "Wake Up Little Susie" by The Everly Brothers
 "Keep A-Knockin'" by Little Richard
 "Little Bitty Pretty One" by Thurston Harris
 "Silhouettes" by The Rays

1957 singles
Dickie Goodman songs
American Christmas songs
Christmas novelty songs
Break-in records
Songs about Elvis Presley
Songs about Santa Claus
Songs about outer space
1952 songs